Mirjana Isaković is a Serbian sculptor and ceramist.

Personal life
She was born in Serbia in 1936. She is married to Halil Tikvesa, a Bosnian painter and graphic designer with whom she has a daughter Lana Tikvesa.

Education
Isaković graduated from the Academy of Applied Arts of University of Arts in Belgrade in 1963, the same year she became a member of "The Applied Artists and Designers Association of Serbia" (ULUPUDS).

Career
In 1971, she was elected professor at the Academy of Applied Arts. She established the important "Belgrade School". She mentored fourteen MA students who matriculated from the Academy of Applied Arts.

In 1972 she became a professor at the Academy where she chaired the departmental studio for ceramics and ceramic sculpture. She retired in 2002.

Exhibitions

Solo exhibitions
 1964 Gallery "Savremeni dom", Belgrade
 1966 Gallery "Nadežda Petrović" Čačak
 1969 Gallery "Grafički kolektiv", Belgrade
 1976 Gallery of Cultural Center, Belgrade
 1978 "Homage to Ivan Tabaković" (with Rosić and Stajević), Arandjelovac
 1985 "Galerija likovnih stvaralaca", Arandjelovac
 1985 "Mali likovni salon", Novi Sad
 1985 Gallery "Singidunum", Belgrade
 1986 Cultural Center, Banjaluka
 1989 Pavilion Cvijeta Zuzorić, as the laureate of Grand Prix of May Salon
 1990 City Museum "Bassano del Grappa", Italy (five Central European ceramic artists, each with an individual show: Polgar, Spurej, Vikova, Sramel, Isaković)

Group exhibitions
Over 150 in the country and abroad

Juried group exhibitions in Serbia (a selection)
 October Salon: 1967, 1968, 1969, 1970, 1974, 1975, 1976, 1977, 1979, 1980, 1986, 1995, 1997, 1999, 2001
 May Salon: 1969, 1970, 1975, 1976, 1977, 1979, 1980, 1986, 1993
 Biennale of Belgrade Ceramics: 1978, 1980
 Triennial of Yugoslav Ceramics: 1968, 1974, 1977, 1980, 1983, 1986, 1989, 1996, 1999, 2003
 1965 Yugoslav Ceramics, Museum of Applied Art, Belgrade
 1972 Contemporary Art of Ceramics and Glass, Galerija Kulturnog centra, Belgrade
 1972 Contemporary Art of Ceramics and Glass, Museum of Arts and Crafts, Zagreb
 1978 The First Sarajevo Triennial of Art, Sarajevo
 1978 Contemporary Tapestry and ceramics of Yugoslavia, Belgrade
 1981 NOB (The People's Liberation Movement) in the Works of Yugoslav Artists, Belgrade, Ljubljana, Sarajevo

Juried international exhibitions (with international juries)
 1967 International Exhibition of Ceramics, Istanbul, Turkey
 1970 International Exhibition of Ceramics, Cervi, Italy
 1970 International Exhibition of Ceramics, Sopot, Poland
 1975 Contemporary Ceramics and Glass, Moscow, USSR
 1975 International Biennale of Ceramics, Valory, France
 1977 International Biennale of Ceramics, Faenya, Italy
 1978 Contemporary Tapestry, Ceramics and Glass, Czechoslovakia, Hungary, East Germany
 1982 II International Biennale of Ceramics, Piran, Slovenia
 1984 III International Biennale of Ceramics, Piran, Slovenia
 1984 I International Triennial of Small Ceramics, Zagreb
 1985 I Triennial of Small Ceramics, Belgrade, Sarajevo, Priština, Novi Sad ( selection)
 1986 IV International Biennale of Ceramics, Piran, Slovenia
 1986 International Competition - Triennial "Mino'86", Nagoya, Japan
 1987 A Selection of Yugoslav Ceramics, Frankfurt, Germany
 1989 "The Contemporary Moment in European Ceramics", (by invitation), Lyon - France, Linz - Austria, Budapest - Hungary, Helsinki - Finland
 1990 III Biennale of Small Ceramics, Zagreb
 1992 I International Biennale of Ceramics, Cairo, Egypt
 1996 I International Triennale "The Cup'96", Kulturni centar, Belgrade
 2000 Thematic International Biennale, Carouge, Switzerland
 2001 International Biennale of Small Form, Gornji Milanovac

Prizes and awards
 1968 Likovni Susret Subotice prize at First Triennial of Yugoslav Ceramics
 1970 Ceramics prize, May Salon, Belgrade
 1970 "Diploma d'onore", International Exhibition of Ceramics, Cervi, Italy
 1977 May Salon Prize, Belgrade
 1977 Grand Prix, at Third Triennial of Yugoslav Ceramics
 1977 Annual ULUPUDSPrize  (for 1976/1977)
 1981 Exhibition NOB (The People's Liberation Movement) Prize in the Works of Yugoslav Artists, Belgrade
 1984 Honorary Diploma at First International Triennial of Small Ceramics, Zagreb
 1986 Grand Prix of May Salon, Belgrade
 1986 Grand Prix at Sixth Triennial of Yugoslav Ceramics, Subotica, Belgrade
 1986 ULUPUDS Prize at October Salon
 1986 Honorable mention at International Competition "Mino'86", Nagoya, Japan
 1986 Grand Plaque of the University of Arts, Belgrade, for pedagogical work
 1998 Award for Life's Work from ULUPUDS
 1998 Plaque with Silver Medal from Professorial and Art Assembly of Faculty of Applied Arts "for extraordinary contribution to the development of this institution for high education"

Works in public spaces (ceramic sculptures)
 Belgrade, Serbia
 Subotica, Serbia
 Arandjelovac, Serbia
 Užice, Serbia
 Zadar, Croatia
 Čačak, Croatia

References

Sources

1936 births
Living people
Serbian sculptors
Serbian ceramists
Serbian women sculptors
Serbian women ceramists